Jagz Nation, Vol.1. Thy Nation Come is the second studio album by Nigerian rapper and record producer Jesse Jagz. It was released by Jagz Nation on July 10, 2013. The album was primarily produced by Jesse Jagz, along with additional production from Shady Bizniz, Kid Konnect, GuiltyBeatz and Samklef. Musically, it is a hip hop and ragga record that incorporates elements of dancehall music. Jesse Jagz enlisted 9ice, Wizkid, Brymo, James Maverik and Lindsey Abudei to appear as guest artists on the album. Jagz Nation, Vol.1. Thy Nation Come was supported by the singles "Redemption", "Bad Girl", "Sex & Scotch" and "God on the Mic". It received generally positive reviews from music critics, who commended  its production, lyrics and themes.

Background and promotion
Jagz Nation, Vol.1. Thy Nation Come is the first project released by Jesse Jagz following his departure from Chocolate City in 2012. Jesse Jagz recorded over 200 songs for the album and worked with producers Kid Konnect, Shady Bizniz, Samklef and GuiltyBeatz. He also reached out to Wizkid, 9ice, Lindsey Abudei and James Maverik for features. Jesse Jagz didn't feature M.I or Ice Prince on the album because he wanted to be the only rapper on it. In an interview posted on MADC.com, he elaborated on the album, saying, "It's just going to be music. With the album I just tried to push the boundary. You know what I mean? Writing, production, arrangement, engineering. I set out to just make good music. Forget about being Nigerian, forget about being in Lagos and just make some good music." Jesse Jagz said he expects to receive mixed reviews when he drops the album, and that being gifted in recording and producing added to the album's depth.

Jesse Jagz promoted the album by holding the Jagz Experience Hip-Hop concert at the New Afrika Shrine on August 24, 2013. He told The Punch newspaper he decided to host the album's launch concert at the Shrine for historical reasons and to accommodate some of his financially unstable fans.

Singles and other releases
The album's lead single "Redemption" was released on May 29, 2013. It received positive reviews from music critics. OkayAfrica said it is "anchored on an addictive clink-clank beat and swerving synth melody, which Jesse Jagz expertly rides and molds into a hip-hop-meets-dancehall gem." The audio and visuals for "Redemption" were released simultaneously. The Wizkid-assisted track "Bad Girl" was released on July 10, 2013, as the album's second single. Its music video was uploaded to YouTube on December 7, 2013.

Jesse Jagz released the Femi Kuti-assisted track "3rd World War" on August 7, 2013. It was initially intended to be included on the album's deluxe edition. However, the deluxe edition was never released. The song ended up being released as the lead single from the Heaven's Hell soundtrack. On January 19, 2014, Jagz Nation released the music video for the album's third single "Sex & Scotch", which was directed by Mex Film Production. On January 23, 2014, Jesse Jagz released the J.O. King-directed animated video for the album's fourth single "God on the Mic".

Critical reception

Jagz Nation, Vol.1. Thy Nation Come received positive reviews from music critics. A writer for 360nobs awarded the album 8.5 stars out of 10, commending its production. Ayomide Tayo of Nigerian Entertainment Today said Jesse Jagz "found the spark that deserted him on his debut" and  characterized the album as "bold, refreshing, challenging, illuminating and genius". Ogaga Sakpaide of TooXclusive called the project a "tour de force" and said Jesse Jagz has "magnificently grown and evolved and shows this as he takes the music into a deeper realm compared to his debut offering Jag of All Tradez". Wilfred Okiche of YNaija described the record as a "tour de force that suffers occasionally from misbegotten ideas of over-reaching". Okichie also opined that "Jesse Jagz isn’t quite God on the mic, but he makes a pretty good impression." Reviewing for TayoTV, Ronke Adepoju awarded the album 8.5 stars out of 10, commending its overall production.

Accolades
Jagz Nation, Vol.1. Thy Nation Come was nominated for Best Album of the Year at the 2014 Nigeria Entertainment Awards. The album was also nominated for Best Rap Album at The Headies 2014.

Track listing
Credits adapted from the website JesseJagz.com.

Notes
 "—" denotes intro and skit

Personnel 

 Jesse Abaga – primary artist, executive producer, writer, arranger, performer, composer
Shady Bizniz –  producer
Kid Konnect –  producer
Bolaji "Phazehop" Williams – sound engineer
GuiltyBeatZ –  producer
Samklef –  producer 
Ayodeji Balogun –  featured artist, performer
Abolore Akande –  featured artist, performer
Olawale Ashimi – featured artist, performer
Lindsey Abudei – featured artist, co-performer
Victoria Kimani –  performer
AyCeeX – writer
James Mavrik – writer

Release history

References

External links
Jagz Nation, Vol.1. Thy Nation Come at SoundCloud

2013 albums
Jesse Jagz albums
Albums produced by Jesse Jagz
Albums produced by Samklef
Albums produced by Shady Bizniz
Albums produced by Kid Konnect
Albums produced by GuiltyBeatz
2013 in Nigerian music